Yafit is an Israeli settlement organized as a moshav shitufi in the West Bank. Located in the Jordan Valley,  it falls under the jurisdiction of Bik'at HaYarden Regional Council.

The international community considers Israeli settlements in the West Bank illegal under international law, but the Israeli government disputes this.

History
According to ARIJ, in 1980 Israel  confiscated 1,294 dunams of land from the Palestinian village of Al-Jiftlik in order to construct  Yafit.

Yafit was built in the 1980s on a plot of rocky land in the Jordan Valley by Israelis attracted by the beauty of the desert. It was named after Yossi Yafa, an IDF commander. In 1992 the founders were joined by immigrants from Russia. In the 1990s, it was one of the largest communities in the valley and a cultural and educational center. Due to drive-by shootings by Palestinians on Route 90, which passes the mountain where the New Testament says Jesus was tempted by the devil, many residents have left.

References

Moshavim
Israeli settlements in the West Bank
Populated places established in 1980
1980 establishments in the Israeli Military Governorate